Čubrić is a Serbian surname, derived from the adjective čubar ("savory"), or a diminutive of the name Čubrilo. It may refer to:

Radoš Čubrić (born 1934), retired Yugoslav cyclist
Rajko Čubrić (born 1958), retired Yugoslav cyclist
Radiša Čubrić (born 1962), retired Serbian cyclist
 (1912–1941), Spanish fighter

Serbian surnames